Santa Fe County/NM 599 is a station on the New Mexico Rail Runner Express commuter rail line, located southwest of Santa Fe, New Mexico, in Santa Fe County. It opened August 1, 2009.

The station platform is located in the median of Interstate Highway 25 adjacent to the State Highway 599 exit.  A walkway over the northbound lanes of I-25 connects the platform with the station's parking area, pick-up/drop-off area, and transit connections.  Roadway access to the station is from NM 599 midway between its junction with NM 14 and the I-25 interchange.

The station has free parking, with over 200 spaces. Santa Fe Trails Route 22 provides service to the station. Additionally, NMDOT Park and Ride provides a bus connection to Los Alamos via the Purple Route, and also provides a shuttle to transfer passengers to various destinations in southern Santa Fe, including the Santa Fe Place Transit Center, where transfers can be made to several Santa Fe Trails routes. The station is also served by the North Central RTD, which provides service to destinations between Santa Fe and Madrid via the 270 Turquoise Trail Route.

Each of the Rail Runner stations contains an icon to express each community's identity. The icon representing this station is the torreon (tower) of the nearby El Rancho de las Golondrinas.

External links
Stations, Santa Fe County/NM 599 Official Rail Runner site

Railway stations in New Mexico
Railway stations in the United States opened in 2009
Buildings and structures in Santa Fe County, New Mexico
Transportation in Santa Fe County, New Mexico
Railway stations in highway medians